Matthew French Oberg (born August 12, 1976, in Larchmont, New York) is an American actor and comedian. He is primarily known for his roles in television series such as The Real O'Neals and Ugly Americans and Hart of Dixie. In 2015, he starred as Mitch Reed in The Comedians.

Filmography

Film

Television

References

External links 
 

Living people
1976 births
21st-century American male actors
American male film actors
People from Larchmont, New York
American male television actors